"Yeah Right" (stylized in all caps) is a song by Japanese singer-songwriter Joji. It is the first single from his debut album, Ballads 1.

Charts

Certifications

References

2018 songs
2018 singles
Joji (musician) songs
Sentimental ballads
Contemporary R&B songs
Downtempo songs
Emo songs